German submarine UA was one of fourteen foreign U-boats in the German Kriegsmarine during the Second World War.

Class
Built at Kiel as one of four submarines of the Ay class for Turkey, Batiray as she was to have been named, was not handed over to the Turkish Navy being seized by Germany and commissioned into the Kriegsmarine in 1939. One boat, was built slowly in a Turkish shipyard. The design was a modification of the Type IX to fit Turkish requirements. Two of the Turkish U-boats served in the Turkish Navy until 1957, but Atilay was lost in a training exercise off Çanakkale.

Service
UA was commissioned on 20 September 1939 under the command of Kapitänleutnant Hans Cohausz. She had been built as a minelayer by the Turks but the Germans used her like a Type IX U-boat. UA was attacked on 8 March 1941 by the destroyer  but survived. During her service, she sank eight Allied ships, including the British 13,950 GRT armed merchant cruiser . Only ten ships in total were destroyed by the Foreign U-boats, UA destroying eight of those. She was used on training duties from July 1942 and carried out no more operational patrols. As the war was drawing to a close she was scuttled on 3 May 1945 at Kiel.

Summary of raiding history

See also

References

Bibliography

External links
 
 

U-boats commissioned in 1939
World War II submarines of Germany
1938 ships
Operation Regenbogen (U-boat)
Maritime incidents in May 1945